Robert W. Stanley (born November 16, 1967 in Brownsburg, Indiana; died May 26, 1994 in Winchester, Indiana) was an American auto racing driver.

He competed in NASCAR Busch Series between 1992 and 1994, he attempted 3 races, failed to qualify in one of them and ran the other two. His best finish was 15th at Indianapolis Raceway Park in 1993 season.

After winning the All-Star Circuit of Champions championship in 1989, he began racing in USAC. It was there that he collected three straight USAC National sprint car championships in 1991, 1992, and 1993 and was on his way to a fourth when his career was cut short in a fatal accident in a USAC sprint car event in Winchester, Indiana, on May 26, 1994.

The family's quarter midget construction operation is named in his memory.

Awards 
2005 - Inducted into the National Sprint Car Hall of Fame
1994 - Inducted into Hoosier Auto Racing Fans (HARF) "Hall of Fame"
1993 - USAC National Sprint Car Series "Champion"
1992 - USAC National Sprint Car Series "Champion"
1991 - USAC National Sprint Car Series "Champion"
1989 - All-Star Circuit of Champions "Champion"
1989 - Hoosier Auto Racing Fans (HARF) "Most Improved Driver"
1984 - Paragon, (IN) Speedway "Rookie of the Year"
1980 - Quarter Midget "National Champion"

References

External links 
 

1967 births
1994 deaths
People from Brownsburg, Indiana
NASCAR drivers
Racing drivers who died while racing
National Sprint Car Hall of Fame inductees
Sports deaths in Indiana
Racing drivers from Indiana
USAC Silver Crown Series drivers
World of Outlaws drivers